The Bahri dynasty or Bahriyya Mamluks was a Mamluk dynasty of mostly Turkic origin that ruled the Egyptian Mamluk Sultanate from 1250 to 1382. They followed the Ayyubid dynasty, and were succeeded by a second Mamluk dynasty, the Burji dynasty.

Their name "Bahriyya" means 'of the river', referring to the location of their original settlement on Al-Rodah Island in the Nile (Nahr al-Nil) in Medieval Cairo at the castle of Al-Rodah which was built by the Ayyubid Sultan as-Salih Ayyub.

History

The Mamluks formed one of the most powerful and wealthiest empires of the time, lasting from 1250 to 1517 in Egypt, North Africa, and the Levant—Near East.

Development
In 1250, when the Ayyubid sultan as-Salih Ayyub died, the Mamluks he had owned as slaves murdered his son and heir al-Muazzam Turanshah, and Shajar al-Durr the widow of as-Salih became the Sultana of Egypt. She married the  Atabeg (commander in chief) Emir Aybak and abdicated, Aybak becoming Sultan. He ruled from 1250 to 1257.

The Mamluks consolidated their power in ten years and eventually established the Bahri dynasty. They were helped by the Mongols' sack of Baghdad in 1258, which effectively destroyed the Abbasid caliphate. Cairo became more prominent as a result and remained a Mamluk capital thereafter.

The Mamluks were powerful cavalry warriors mixing the practices of the Turkic steppe peoples from which they were drawn and the organizational and technological sophistication  and horsemanship of the Arabs. In 1260 the Mamluks defeated a Mongol army at the Battle of Ain Jalut in present-day Israel and eventually forced the invaders to retreat to the area of modern-day Iraq. The defeat of the Mongols at the hands of the Mamluks enhanced the position of the Mamluks in the southern Mediterranean basin. Baibars, one of the leaders at the battle, became the new Sultan after the assassination of Sultan Qutuz on the way home.

In 1250 Baibars was one of the Mamluk commanders who defended Mansurah against the Crusade knights of Louis IX of France, who was later definitely defeated, captured in the Battle of Fariskur and ransomed. Baibars had also taken part in the Mamluk takeover of Egypt. In 1261, after he became a Sultan, he established a puppet Abbasid caliphate in Cairo, and the Mamluks fought the remnants of the Crusader states in Palestine until they finally captured Acre in 1291.

Tatars and Mongols
Many Tatars settled in Egypt and were employed by Baibars. He defeated the Mongols at the battle of Elbistan and sent the Abbasid Caliph with only 250 men to attempt to retake Baghdad, but was unsuccessful. In 1266 he devastated Cilician Armenia and in 1268 he recaptured Antioch from the Crusaders. In addition, he fought the Seljuks, and Hashshashin; he also extended Muslim power into Nubia for the first time, before his death in 1277.

Sultan Qalawun defeated a rebellion in Syria that was led by Sunqur al-Ashqar in 1280, and also defeated another Mongol invasion in 1281 that was led by Abaqa outside Homs. After the Mongol threat passed he recaptured Tripoli from the Crusaders in 1289. His son Khalil captured Acre, the last Crusader city, in 1291.

The Mongols renewed their invasion in 1299, but were again defeated in 1303 in the Battle of Shaqhab. The Egyptian Mamluk Sultans entered into relations with the Golden Horde who converted to Islam and established a peace pact with the Mongols in 1322.

Sultan Al-Nasir Muhammad married a Mongol princess in 1319. His diplomatic relations were more extensive than those of any previous Sultan, and included Bulgarian, Indian, and Abyssinian potentates, as well as the pope, the king of Aragon and the king of France. Al-Nasir Muhammad organized the re-digging of a canal in 1311 which connected Alexandria with the Nile. He died in 1341.

Dissolution
The constant changes of sultans that followed led to great disorder in the provinces. Meanwhile, in 1349 Egypt and the Levant in general were introduced to Black Death, which is said to have killed many inhabitants.

In 1382 the last Bahri Sultan Hajji II was dethroned and the Sultanate was taken over by the Circassian Emir Barquq. He was expelled in 1389 but returned to power in 1390, setting up the succeeding Burji dynasty.

Military organization
On a general level, the military during the Bahri dynasty can be divided into several aspects

 Mamluks: The core of both the political and military base, these slave soldiers were further divided into Khassaki (comparable to imperial guards), Royal Mamluks (Mamluks directly under the command of the Sultan) and regular Mamluks (usually assigned to local Amirs).
 Al-Halqa: These primarily free born professional forces wre also directly under the sultan's command.
 Wafidiyya: Turks and Mongols that migrated to the dynasty's border after the Mongol invasion, typically given land grants in exchange for military service; they were well regarded forces.
 Other levies: Primarily Bedouin tribes, but also on different occasions also different groups of Turkomans and other settled Arabs.

List of Bahri Sultans

Following As-Saleh, the Burji dynasty took over the Mamluk Sultanate under Sayf-ad-Din Barquq in 1389–90 C.E.

See also

Turkic peoples
Timeline of the Turkic peoples (500–1300)
List of Turkic dynasties and countries
Aybak
Egypt in the Middle Ages
Mamluk
Qalawun complex
Shajar al-Durr
List of Sunni dynasties

Notes

References

Bibliography

 Al-Maqrizi, al-Mawaiz wa al-'i'tibar bi dhikr al-khitat wa al-'athar, Matabat aladab, Cairo 1996, 
 Idem in French: Bouriant, Urbain, Description topographique et historique de l'Egypte, Paris 1895.
 Ayalon, D.: The Mamluk Military Society. London, 1979.
Ibn Taghri, al-Nujum al-Zahirah Fi Milook Misr wa al-Qahirah, al-Hay'ah al-Misreyah 1968
 Idem in English: History of Egypt, by Yusef. William Popper, translator Abu L-Mahasin ibn Taghri Birdi, University of California Press 1954.
 Shayyal, Jamal, Prof. of Islamic history, Tarikh Misr al-Islamiyah (History of Islamic Egypt), dar al-Maref, Cairo 1266,

External links

 
Mamluk Sultanate
Turkic dynasties
Kipchaks
1250 establishments
13th-century establishments in the Mamluk Sultanate
1382 disestablishments
14th-century disestablishments in the Mamluk Sultanate